Erik Daniel Victor Sundin (born 1 March 1979) is a retired Swedish footballer who played for Hammarby IF in Superettan as a forward. He also played for AIK, Enebybergs IF, Café Opera United, Väsby United, Assyriska FF, Trelleborgs FF and Helsingborgs IF.

References

External links
 

1979 births
Living people
Association football midfielders
Swedish footballers
Allsvenskan players
Superettan players
Trelleborgs FF players
Helsingborgs IF players
AFC Eskilstuna players
Assyriska FF players
Hammarby Fotboll players
Footballers from Stockholm